Cheesequake is an unincorporated community located within Old Bridge Township in Middlesex County, New Jersey, United States. Cheesequake is located along Route 34, south of Cheesequake State Park.

The community's name has been said to be derived from the Lenni Lenape word "Cheseh-oh-ke", meaning "upland" or from the word "chickhake", meaning "land that has been cleared."

References

Old Bridge Township, New Jersey
Unincorporated communities in Middlesex County, New Jersey
Unincorporated communities in New Jersey